Toll-like receptor 2 also known as TLR2 is a protein that in humans is encoded by the TLR2 gene. TLR2 has also been designated as CD282 (cluster of differentiation 282). TLR2 is one of the toll-like receptors and plays a role in the immune system. TLR2 is a membrane protein, a receptor, which is expressed on the surface of certain cells and recognizes foreign substances and passes on appropriate signals to the cells of the immune system.

Function 

The protein encoded by this gene is a member of the Toll-like receptor (TLR) family, which plays a fundamental role in pathogen recognition and activation of innate immunity. TLRs are highly conserved from Drosophila to humans and share structural and functional similarities. They recognize pathogen-associated molecular patterns (PAMPs) that are expressed on infectious agents, and mediate the production of cytokines necessary for the development of effective immunity. The various TLRs exhibit different patterns of expression. This gene is expressed most abundantly in peripheral blood leukocytes, and mediates host response to Gram-positive bacteria and yeast via stimulation of NF-κB.

In the intestine, TLR2 regulates the expression of CYP1A1, which is a key enzyme in detoxication of carcinogenic polycyclic aromatic hydrocarbons such as benzo(a)pyrene.

Background 

The immune system recognizes foreign pathogens and eliminates them.  This occurs in several phases.  In the early inflammation phase, the pathogens are recognized by antibodies that are already present (innate or acquired through prior infection; see also cross-reactivity).  Immune-system components (e.g. complement) are bound to the antibodies and kept near, in reserve to disable them via phagocytosis by scavenger cells (e.g. macrophages).  Dendritic cells are likewise capable of phagocytizing but do not do it for the purpose of direct pathogen elimination.  Rather, they infiltrate the spleen and lymph nodes, and each presents components of an antigen there, as the result of which specific antibodies are formed that recognize precisely that antigen.

These newly formed antibodies would arrive too late in an acute infection, however, so what we think of as "immunology" constitutes only the second half of the process.  Because this phase would always start too late to play an essential role in the defense process, a faster-acting principle is applied ahead of it, one that occurs only in forms of life that are phylogenetically more highly developed.

What are called pattern-recognition receptors come into play here. This refers to receptors that recognize the gross, primarily structural features of molecules not innate to the host organism.  These include, for example, lipids with a totally different basic chemical structure.  Such receptors are bound directly to cells of the immune system and cause immediate activation of their respective nonspecific immune cells.

A prime example of such a foreign ligand is bacterial endotoxin, whose effects have been known for generations.  When it enters the bloodstream it causes systematic activation of the early-phase response, with all the side effects of septic shock.  This is known in the laboratory as the Shwartzman phenomenon.  The intended effect is to mobilize the organism for combat, so to speak, and eliminate most of the pathogens.

Mechanism 

As a membrane surface receptor, TLR2 recognizes many bacterial, fungal, viral, and certain endogenous substances.  In general, this results in the uptake (internalization, phagocytosis) of bound molecules by endosomes/phagosomes and in cellular activation; thus such elements of innate immunity as macrophages, PMNs and dendritic cells assume functions of nonspecific immune defense, B1a and MZ B cells form the first antibodies, and specific antibody formation gets started in the process.  Cytokines participating in this include tumor necrosis factor-alpha (TNF-α) and various interleukins (IL-1α, IL-1β, IL-6, IL-8, IL-12).  Before the TLRs were known, several of the substances mentioned were classified as modulins.  Due to the cytokine pattern, which corresponds more closely to Th1, an immune deviation is seen in this direction in most experimental models, away from Th2 characteristics. Conjugates are being developed as vaccines or are already being used without a priori knowledge.

A peculiarity first recognized in 2006 is the expression of TLR2 on Tregs (a type of T cell), which experience both TCR-controlled proliferation and functional inactivation.  This leads to disinhibition of the early inflammation phase and of specific antibody formation.  Following a reduction in pathogen count, many pathogen-specific Tregs are present that, now without a TLR2 signal, become active and inhibit the specific and inflammatory immune reactions (see also TNF-β, IL-10).  Older literature that ascribes a direct immunity-stimulating effect via TLR2 to a given molecule must be interpreted in light of the fact that the TLR2 knockouts employed typically have very few Tregs.

Functionally relevant polymorphisms are reported that cause functional impairment and thus, in general, reduced survival rates, in particular in infections/sepsis with Gram-positive bacteria.

Signal transduction is depicted under Toll-like receptor.

Expression 

TLR2 is expressed on microglia, Schwann cells, monocytes, macrophages, dendritic cells, polymorphonuclear leukocytes (PMNs or PMLs), B cells (B1a, MZ B, B2), and T cells, including Tregs (CD4+CD25+ regulatory T cells).  In some cases, it occurs in a heterodimer (combination molecule), e.g., paired with TLR-1 or TLR-6.  TLR2 is also found in the epithelia of air passages, pulmonary alveoli, renal tubules, and the Bowman's capsules in renal corpuscles. TLR2 is also expressed by intestinal epithelial cells and subsets of lamina propria mononuclear cells in the gastrointestinal tract 
. In the skin, it is found on keratinocytes and sebaceous glands; spc1 is induced here, allowing a bactericidal sebum to be formed.

Cancer 
TLR2 gene has been observed progressively downregulated in Human papillomavirus-positive neoplastic keratinocytes derived from uterine cervical preneoplastic lesions at different levels of malignancy. For this reason, TLR2 is likely to be associated with tumorigenesis and may be a potential prognostic marker for uterine cervical preneoplastic lesions progression.

Agonists

The following ligands have been reported to be agonists of the toll-like receptor 2:

Interactions

Protein-protein interactions 

TLR 2 has been shown to interact with TLR 1 and TOLLIP.

Protein-ligand interactions 

TLR2 resides on the plasma membrane where it responds to lipid-containing PAMPs such as lipoteichoic acid and di- and tri-acylated cysteine-containing lipopeptides. It does this by forming dimeric complexes with either TLR 1 or TLR6 on the plasma membrane. TLR2 interactions with malarial glycophosphatidylinositols of Plasmodium falciparum was shown and a detailed structure of TLR–GPI interactions was computationally predicted.

Gene polymorphisms

Various single nucleotide polymorphisms (SNPs) of the TLR2 have been identified  and for some of them an association with faster progression and a more severe course of sepsis in critically ill patients was reported. No association with occurrence of severe staphylococcal infection was found. Moreover, a recent study reported rs111200466, a TLR2 promoter insertion/deletion polymorphism as a prognosis factor in HIV-1 disease progression. The authors showed a correlation of the polymorphism with a faster progression to the CD4+ < 200 cells/μL outcome for the deletion allele carriers.

References

Further reading 

 
 
 
 
 
 
 

Clusters of differentiation
2